
Gmina Fabianki is a rural gmina (administrative district) in Włocławek County, Kuyavian-Pomeranian Voivodeship, in north-central Poland.

Villages
Gmina Fabianki contains the villages and settlements of Bogucin, Chełmica Duża, Chełmica Mała, Chełmica-Cukrownia, Cyprianka, Fabianki, Krępiny, Kulin, Lisek, Nasiegniewo, Nowy Witoszyn, Skórzno, Stary Witoszyn, Świątkowizna, Szpetal Górny and Wilczeniec Fabiański.

Neighbouring gminas
Gmina Fabianki is bordered by the city of Włocławek and by the gminas of Bobrowniki, Dobrzyń nad Wisłą, Lipno and Wielgie.

References
Polish official population figures 2006

Fabianki
Włocławek County